Carmen J. Cividanes Lago is a Puerto Rican developmental psychologist and academic administrator. She was the president of the Bayamón Central University in 2021. She was previously the executive director of the Association of Private Colleges and Universities of Puerto Rico.

Life 
Cividanes Lago was raised in San Juan, Puerto Rico. Spanish is her native language and she was raised bilingual in English and began studying French at the age of 12. While completing a bachelor's degree at Mount Holyoke College, she studied abroad for a semester in Paris through Wesleyan University. During her undergraduate studies, Cividanes Lago taught French and Spanish. She completed a master's degree in education from Harvard University. Cividanes Lago earned a Ph.D. in developmental psychology at the University of Oxford. Her doctoral research investigated mathematical reasoning in children.

In 1994, Cividanes Lago returned to Puerto Rico after working off the island for 15 years. She worked for the graduate school of public administration at the University of Puerto Rico. Cividanes Lago served as the executive director of the Association of Private Colleges and Universities of Puerto Rico. In March 2021, she became president of Bayamón Central University. Later that year, Cividanes Lago was succeeded by interim president Fray Oscar Morales Cruz.

Cividanes Lago has a son.

References 

Living people
Year of birth missing (living people)
People from San Juan, Puerto Rico
American developmental psychologists
21st-century American psychologists
American women psychologists
21st-century Puerto Rican women
Mount Holyoke College alumni
Harvard University alumni
Alumni of the University of Oxford
21st-century American women scientists
Heads of universities and colleges in the United States
Women heads of universities and colleges